Noah Rubin was the defending champion but chose not to defend his title.

Marc Polmans won the title after defeating Bradley Mousley 6–2, 6–2 in the final.

Seeds

Draw

Finals

Top half

Bottom half

References
Main Draw
Qualifying Draw

Launceston Tennis International - Men's Singles
2018 Men's Singles